James Leslie Temple (16 September 1904 – 1960) was an English professional footballer who played as a winger for Sunderland.

References

1904 births
1960 deaths
Sportspeople from Scarborough, North Yorkshire
English footballers
Association football wingers
Wallsend F.C. players
Fulham F.C. players
Sunderland A.F.C. players
Gateshead F.C. players
Crook Town A.F.C. players
Ashington A.F.C. players
English Football League players